Payaw may refer to:

 Cyrtosperma merkusii, a taro plant grown in the Philippines
 Homalomena philippinensis, an ornamental plant native to the Philippines and Orchid Island
 Payaw, a town in Lahe Township, Myanmar